The Town Hall was a local government building located in St Nicholas Square, Newcastle upon Tyne.

History
Until the mid-19th century civic leaders had held their meetings in the Guildhall. The town hall had its origins in the Corn Exchange which was designed by John and Benjamin Green and built in stone in St Nicholas Square (between the Bigg Market and the Cloth Market) by a private company in 1839.

The foundation stone for the new town hall was laid by the mayor, Sir Isaac Lowthian Bell, in 1855. The design, which was undertaken by John Johnstone in the Italian neoclassical style, involved incorporating the Corn Exchange into the central section of the building as an assembly hall capable of accommodating 3,000 people: a large concert organ was acquired at that time. The design also involved a council chamber and municipal offices for Newcastle Town Council. The main frontage of the new building, facing the cathedral, had four Corinthian order columns on the ground floor and also on the first floor while the rear elevation, facing onto the Bigg Market, had a tower with a cupola. The works, which cost some £50,000, were completed in 1863.

The first organised dog show in the UK was held in the assembly hall in the building in 1859. The town council, which became a city council in 1882, failed to maintain the building properly and the tower had to be demolished in the 1930s.

By the middle of the 20th century condition of the town hall had deteriorated to such an extent that the council was forced to relocate to modern facilities at Newcastle Civic Centre in Barras Bridge in 1968. A "winter zoo" involving lions, tigers, monkeys, exotic birds and snakes continued to be held in the building in the late 1960s but, ultimately, the town hall had to be demolished in 1973. The site was subsequently redeveloped to create a complex of modern office buildings known as No. 1 Cathedral Square (the southern section) and Stanegate House (the northern section).

References

Buildings and structures in Newcastle upon Tyne
City and town halls in Tyne and Wear
Government buildings completed in 1863